Aconitum firmum (Polish: tojad mocny, Czech: oměj tuhý, Ukrainian: Аконіт міцний, Romanized: Akonіt mіtzniy) is a species of monkshood that is found in Southern Poland, Slovakia, and Czechia, with a few instances in Ukraine and Romania.

Appearance
Aconitum firmum has indigo flowers that are about 2 centimeters big, and can grow up to around 40 centimeters tall.

Toxicity
Like all monkshoods, Aconitum firmum is highly poisonous. All parts of the plant, with the highest concentration being in the roots and seeds, contain aconitine, which is a potent nerve poison.

Conservation
In Poland, Aconitum firmum is a protected species, along with all other monkshood species in Poland. The subspecies A. firmum subsp. moravicum is recognized as Near Threatened by the IUCN Red List, although A. firmum itself has not been evaluated by the IUCN.

Taxonomy

Name
Aconitum firmum was named by Ludwig Reichenbach. The species name firmum comes from the inflection of the Latin word firmus, meaning stable and firm. The Czech, Polish, and Ukrainian common names reflect on this and can be literally translated to "strong aconite".

Subspecies
Aconitum firmum is divided into 6 subspecies and 1 variety which are:

 Aconitum firmum subsp. bucovinense (Zapal.) Aschers. & Graebn.
 Aconitum firmum subsp. firmum
 Aconitum firmum subsp. maninense (Skalický) Starm.
 Aconitum firmum subsp. moravicum V.Skalick
 Aconitum firmum subsp. paxii Starm.
 Aconitum firmum subsp. zapalowiczii Starm.
 Aconitum firmum var. portae-ferratae Starm. & Mitka

References

firmum
Taxa named by Ludwig Reichenbach